Bahai was a chieftain of the Wanyan tribe, the most dominant among the Jurchen tribes which later founded the Jin dynasty (1115–1234). He was the eldest son of Wulu.

Bahai was given the posthumous name Emperor An (安皇帝) by his descendant, Emperor Xizong.

Family
 Father: Wulu
 Mother: Wulu's primary consort, posthumously honoured as Empress Si (思皇后)
 Spouse: Name unknown, posthumously honoured as Empress Jie (節皇后)
 Sons:
 Suike, posthumously honoured as Emperor Xianzu
 Xinde (敵酷)
 Xiekude (敵古乃)
 Xieyibao (撒里輦)
 Xielihu (謝里忽)

References
 

Jurchen rulers